The Sounds of the World's Languages, sometimes abbreviated SOWL, is a 1996 book by Peter Ladefoged and Ian Maddieson which documents a global survey of the sound patterns of natural languages. Drawing from the authors' own fieldwork and experiments as well as existing literature, it provides an articulatory and acoustic description of vowels and consonants from more than 300 languages. It is a prominent reference work in the field of phonetics.

Following discussions of the book's aim and underlying frameworks, the description of sounds is divided into chapters on stops, nasals and nasalized consonants, fricatives, laterals, rhotics, clicks, vowels, and multiple articulatory gestures, which are then followed by a discussion of the data's phonological implications.

References

1996 non-fiction books
Phonetics books
Phonology books
Wiley-Blackwell books